Mia Kristina Makaroff (born 12 April 1970) is a Finnish composer, best known for her work for the Finnish a cappella ensemble Rajaton.

References

1970 births
Living people
Finnish composers
Place of birth missing (living people)
21st-century Finnish women